Dwight A. York (born November 25, 1939) is a former member of the Wisconsin State Assembly.

Biography
York was born on November 25, 1939, in New Lisbon, Wisconsin. He graduated from New Lisbon High School before obtaining a B.A. from the University of Wisconsin-Whitewater and an M.A. from Colorado State University. York is married with two children.

Career
York was elected to the Assembly in 1984 and served a single two-year term from 1985 to 1987. Previously, he served as Superintendent of Schools of Lomira, Wisconsin. He is a Republican.

References

1939 births
Living people
People from New Lisbon, Wisconsin
People from Lomira, Wisconsin
Republican Party members of the Wisconsin State Assembly
University of Wisconsin–Whitewater alumni
Colorado State University alumni